Finnish Australians are Australian citizens of Finnish ancestry or Finland-born people who reside in Australia. According to Finnish estimates, there are approximately 30,000 Australians of Finnish ancestry, and about 7,500 Finland-born Finns residing in Australia.

History 
Many Finnish immigrants began arriving in Australia between 1947 and 1971. When these new immigrants came to Australia, they were taken to refugee camps. Once in the camp, they were given free room and board until the head of the family was assigned his first job. The largest and best-known of these camps was Bonegilla, a former military camp in northern Victoria. Most of these Finns, along with more than 300,000 immigrants from other countries, began their new lives in Bonegilla during this period.

The first group of Finnish immigrants who arrived in Australia came to work in the gold mines of Victoria in the 1850s. Years later, after the first significant wave of Finnish immigration in the 1920s, a second major wave of immigrants from the Nordic country takes place again, this being more numerous than the first one. Finns were usually hired to perform heavy physical labour. Despite this, they were particularly attracted by the income from the sugar cane fields and mining in Mount Isa, in north Queensland. As a result, Mount Isa has one of the largest Finnish communities in Australia.

At the end of the Second World War, around 20,000 Finns had moved to Australia. In the last three decades the Finnish immigration has dropped significantly.

In the mid 1950s an economic crisis occurs in Finland causing a new wave of Finnish immigration to Australia. One of the main reasons for leaving Finland, besides crisis, was Australia's reinvigorated assisted passage scheme.

Notable people 

 Matt Acton, goalkeeper
 Carsten Haitzler, software engineer
 Greg Norman, professional golfer
 Connie Garner, bodybuilder, actor, fitness model and cybersecurity
 Sanna Jalomäki, singer, songwriter and painter
 Paul Sironen, rugby league player
 Satu Vänskä, violinist
 Shane Jacobson, actor, director, writer, and comedian
David Michael, Western Australian politician

See also 
 Australia–Finland relations
 European Australians
 Europeans in Oceania
 Finnish diaspora
 Immigration to Australia
 Norwegian Australians
 Scandinavian Australians
 Swedish Australians

References